Langenhahn is an Ortsgemeinde – a community belonging to a Verbandsgemeinde – in the Westerwaldkreis in Rhineland-Palatinate, Germany.

Geography

Location
Langenhahn lies in the Upper Westerwald and belongs to the Verbandsgemeinde of Westerburg, a kind of collective municipality. Through the community flows the Elbbach, which rises in the neighbouring community of Ailertchen and empties into the Lahn near Limburg an der Lahn. The municipal area lies at an elevation of 400 to 505 m above sea level.

Constituent communities
Langenhahn's Ortsteile are Langenhahn, Hinterkirchen, Hintermühlen and Hölzenhausen.

History
In 1334, Langenhahn had its first documentary mention as Landenhain. In 1386, Hölzenhausen followed as Holtershusen, in 1417 Hinterkirchen as Hinterkirche and 1593 Hintermühlen as “uff der Hintermuell im Braeschied”. The merger into a single community came about in 1969.

Coat of arms
The two crossed arrows in the community's arms, which refer to Saint Sebastian’s martyrdom, symbolize Saint Sebastian's Chapel. The six-spoked waterwheel stands for milling, which has been of great importance in the municipal area's history. The four lozenges symbolize the four constituent communities and refer to the lordly aspect. The tincture red recalls the community's allegiance to Diez, and the tincture blue Nassau’s state colours.

Economy and infrastructure

Langenhahn lies on Bundesstraße 255 and is connected to the Oberwesterwaldbahn (railway) whose highest point at 463 m above sea level lies in Langenhahn.

Sport

The well known football club SG Langenhahn/Rothenbach is from Langenhahn. The team reached the Verbandsliga, today's Rheinlandliga, in the 1999/2000 season.

In Langenhahn there is a hard tennis court and a multi-purpose hall, which is used mainly for sporting activities.

References

Municipalities in Rhineland-Palatinate
Westerwaldkreis